Ellesmere Island is Canada's northernmost and third largest island, and the tenth largest in the world.

Lying within the Arctic Archipelago, Ellesmere Island is considered part of the Queen Elizabeth Islands. Cape Columbia at 83°06′ is the northernmost point of land in Canada and one of the northernmost points of land on the planet (the northernmost point of land on Earth is the nearby Kaffeklubben Island of Greenland).

The Arctic Cordillera mountain system covers much of Ellesmere Island, making it the most mountainous in the Arctic Archipelago. More than one-fifth of the island is protected as Quttinirpaaq National Park.

In 2021, the population of Ellesmere Island was recorded at 144. There are three settlements: Alert, Eureka, and Grise Fiord. Ellesmere Island is administered as part of the Qikiqtaaluk Region in the Canadian territory of Nunavut.

History
The first human inhabitants of Ellesmere Island were small bands drawn to the area for Peary caribou, muskox, and marine mammal hunting about 2000–1000 BCE.
-
As was the case for the Dorset (or Paleo-Eskimo) hunters and the pioneering Neo-Eskimos, the post-Ruin Island and Late Thule culture Inuit used the Bache Peninsula region extensively both summer and winter until environmental, ecological, and possibly social circumstances caused the area to be abandoned. It was the last region in the Canadian High Arctic to be depopulated during the Little Ice Age, attesting to its general economic importance as part of the Smith Sound culture sphere of which it was occasionally a part and sometimes the principal settlement component.

Vikings from the Greenland colonies reached Ellesmere Island, Skraeling Island, and Ruin Island during hunting expeditions and trading with the Inuit groups. Unusual structures on Bache Peninsula may be the remains of a late-period Dorset stone longhouse.

The first European to sight the island after the height of the Little Ice Age was William Baffin in 1616. Ellesmere Island was named in 1852 by Edward Inglefield's expedition after the English politician Francis Egerton, 1st Earl of Ellesmere, who was President of the Royal Geographical Society from 1853 to 1855. The United States expedition led by Adolphus Greely in 1881 crossed the island from east to west, establishing Fort Conger in the northern part of the island. The Greely expedition found fossil forests on Ellesmere Island in the late 1880s. Stenkul Fiord was first explored in 1902 by Per Schei, a member of Otto Sverdrup's 2nd Norwegian Polar Expedition.

The Ellesmere Ice Shelf was documented by the British Arctic Expedition of 1875–76, in which Lieutenant Pelham Aldrich's party went from Cape Sheridan west to Cape Alert, including the Ward Hunt Ice Shelf. In 1906 Robert Peary led an expedition in northern Ellesmere Island, from Cape Sheridan along the coast to the western side of Nansen Sound (93°W). During Peary's expedition, the ice shelf was continuous; it has since been estimated to have covered . The ice shelf broke apart in the 20th century, presumably due to climate change.

Geography

Ellesmere Island is separated to the east by Nares Strait from Greenland, to the west by Eureka Sound and Nansen Sound from Axel Heiberg Island, and to the south by Jones Sound and Cardigan Strait from Devon Island.

Ellesmere Island contains Canada's northernmost point, Cape Columbia, at 83° 06′ 41″N, and is separated from the Severnaya Zemlya across the North Pole by under .

Protected areas
More than one-fifth of the island is protected as Quttinirpaaq National Park (formerly Ellesmere Island National Park Reserve), which includes seven fjords and a variety of glaciers, as well as Lake Hazen, North America's largest lake north of the Arctic Circle. Barbeau Peak, the highest mountain in Nunavut is located in the British Empire Range on Ellesmere Island. The most northern mountain range in the world, the Challenger Mountains, is located in the northeast region of the island. The northern lobe of the island is called Grant Land.

The Arctic willow is the only woody species to grow on Ellesmere Island.

In July 2007, a study noted the disappearance of habitat for waterfowl, invertebrates, and algae on Ellesmere Island. According to John Smol of Queen's University in Kingston, Ontario, and Marianne S. V. Douglas of the University of Alberta in Edmonton, warming conditions and evaporation have caused low water levels and changes in the chemistry of ponds and wetlands in the area. The researchers noted that "In the 1980s they often needed to wear hip waders to make their way to the ponds...while by 2006 the same areas were dry enough to burn."

Climate
Ellesmere Island has a tundra climate (Köppen ET) and an ice cap climate (Köppen EF) with the temperature being cold year-round.

Glaciers, ice caps and ice shelves

Large portions of Ellesmere Island are covered with glaciers and ice, with Manson Icefield and Sydkap in the south; Prince of Wales Icefield and Agassiz Ice Cap along the central-east side of the island, and the Northern Ellesmere icefields.
The Ellesmere Ice Shelf shrank by 90 per cent in the 20th century due to warming trends in the Arctic, particularly in the 1930s and 1940s, a period when the largest ice islands (the  T1 and the  T2 ice islands) were formed leaving the separate Alfred Ernest, Ayles, Milne, Ward Hunt, and Markham Ice Shelves. The Ward Hunt Ice Shelf, the largest remaining section of thick (>10 m, >30 ft) landfast sea ice along the northern coastline of Ellesmere Island, lost  of ice in a massive calving in 1961–1962. It further decreased by 27% in thickness between 1967 and 1999.

The breakup of the Ellesmere Ice Shelves has continued in the 21st century: the Ward Ice Shelf experienced a major breakup during the summer of 2002; the Ayles Ice Shelf calved entirely on August 13, 2005; the largest breakoff of the ice shelf in 25 years, it may pose a threat to the oil industry in the Beaufort Sea. In April 2008, it was discovered that the Ward Hunt shelf was fractured, with dozens of deep, multi-faceted cracks and in September 2008 the Markham shelf completely broke off to become floating sea ice.

A study published 2018 by White and Copland measured an areal reduction of 5.9% in 1773 glaciers in Northern Ellesmere island in the 16-year period 1999–2015 based on satellite data. In the same period 19 out of 27 ice tongues disintegrated to their grounding lines and ice shelves suffered a 42% loss in surface area.

Paleontology

Schei and later Alfred Gabriel Nathorst described the Paleocene-Eocene (ca. 55 Ma) fossil forest in the Stenkul Fiord sediments. The Stenkul Fiord site represents a series of deltaic swamp and floodplain forests. The trees stood for at least 400 years. Individual stumps and stems of >1 m (>3 ft) diameter were abundant, and are identified as Metasequoia and possibly Glyptostrobus. Well preserved Pliocene peats containing abundant vertebrate and plant macrofossils characteristic of a boreal forest have been reported from Strathcona Fiord.

In 2006, University of Chicago paleontologist Neil Shubin and Academy of Natural Sciences paleontologist Ted Daeschler reported the discovery of the fossil of a Paleozoic (ca. 375 Ma) fish, named Tiktaalik roseae, in the former stream beds of Ellesmere Island. The fossil exhibits many characteristics of fish, but also indicates a transitional creature that may be a predecessor of amphibians, reptiles, birds, and mammals, including humans.

In 2011, Jason P. Downs and co-authors described the sarcopterygian Laccognathus embryi from specimens collected from the same locality that Tiktaalik was found.

Insect ecology
Ellesmere Island is noted as being the northernmost occurrence of eusocial insects; specifically, the bumblebee Bombus polaris. There is a second species of bumblebee occurring there, Bombus hyperboreus, which is a parasite in the nests of B. polaris.

While non-eusocial, the Arctic woolly bear moth (Gynaephora groenlandica) can also be found at Ellesmere Island. While this species generally has a 10-year life cycle, its life is known to extend to up to 14 years at both the Alexandra Fiord lowland and Ellesmere Island.

Earth's magnetism

Population

In 2021, the population of Ellesmere Island was recorded as 144. There are three settlements on Ellesmere Island: Alert (permanent pop. 0, but home to a small temporary population), Eureka (permanent pop. 0), and Grise Fiord (pop. 144). Politically, it is part of the Qikiqtaaluk Region.

Alert 
Canadian Forces Station (CFS) Alert is the northernmost continuously inhabited settlement in the world. With the end of the Cold War and the advent of new technologies allowing for remote interpretation of data, the overwintering population has been reduced to 62 civilians and military personnel as of 2016.

Eureka 
Eureka (the third northernmost settlement in the world) consists of three areas: Eureka Aerodrome, which includes Fort Eureka (the quarters for military personnel maintaining the island's communications equipment); the Environment Canada Weather Station; and the Polar Environment Atmospheric Research Laboratory (PEARL), formerly the Arctic Stratospheric Ozone (AStrO) Observatory. Eureka has the lowest average annual temperature and least precipitation of any weather station in Canada.

Grise Fiord 

Grise Fiord (Inuktitut: , Romanized: , lit. "place that never thaws") is an Inuit hamlet that, despite a population of only 144, is the largest community on Ellesmere Island.

Grise Fiord is the northernmost civilian settlement in Canada.

Grise Fiord is cradled by the Arctic Cordillera mountain range.

In popular culture
Ellesmere Island is the setting of much of Melanie McGrath’s The Long Exile: A True Story of Deception and Survival Amongst the Inuit of the Canadian Arctic about the High Arctic relocation, and also of her Edie Kiglatuk mystery series.

In the 2013 American superhero film Man of Steel, Ellesmere Island was the site of a combined United States-Canadian scientific expedition to recover an ancient Kryptonian spaceship buried in the glacial ice pack.

The island was the location for the 2014 BBC programme Snow Wolf Family and Me.

Ellesmere Island (and in particular the Milne ice shelf) is a main location in Dan Brown's novel Deception Point.

The 2008 documentary Exile by Zacharias Kunuk documents the experiences of Inuit families who were forcibly relocated to Ellesmere island in the 1950s to 'settle' it for the Canadian government. The families discuss being deceived by the Canadian government about the conditions and terms of where they were going and having to endure years of surviving in inhospitable conditions with little food or water.

See also

Ellesmere Island Volcanics
Lomonosov Ridge
Ledoyom
Serson Ice Shelf
Borup Fiord Pass

References

Further reading

External links

 Ellesmere Island in the Atlas of Canada - Toporama; Natural Resources Canada
 Mountains on Ellesmere Island
 Detailed map, northern Ellesmere Island, including named capes, points, bays, and offshore islands by Geoffrey Hattersley-Smith
 Norman E. Brice Report on Ellesmere Island at Dartmouth College Library

 
Islands of Baffin Bay
Islands of the Queen Elizabeth Islands
Inhabited islands of Qikiqtaaluk Region